Emmanuel Trélat (born 24 December 1974) is a French mathematician.

Education and career
Emmanuel Trélat was admitted at École normale supérieure de Cachan (mathematics) in 1995 and obtained the agrégation in 1998. In 2000, he obtained a doctorate under the direction of Bernard Bonnard at the University of Burgundy at Dijon with thesis titled Étude asymptotique et transcendance de la fonction valeur en contrôle optimal; catégorie log-exp en géométrie sous-Riemannienne dans le cas Martinet (Asymptotic study and transcendence of the value function in optimal control; category log-exp in sub-Riemannian geometry in the Martinet case). In 2001 he was appointed an assistant professor at the University of Paris-Sud, where he obtained in 2005 his habilitation Contrôle en dimension finie et infinie (Control in finite and infinite dimension). In 2006 he was appointed a professor at the University of Orleans.

Emmanuel Trélat's research focuses on control theory in finite and infinite dimensions, sub-Riemannian geometry, image analysis, domain optimization. He is also a specialist in numerical methods in optimal control, particularly in aerospace applications.

Honors and awards
 2006 — SIAM Outstanding Paper Prize
 2010 — Prix Maurice-Audin 
 2011 — elected a member of the Institut universitaire de France
 2012 — Felix Klein Prize
 2014 — Prix Blaise-Pascal
 2016 — Prix Madame Victor Noury
 2018 — Invited Speaker, International Congress of Mathematicians at Rio de Janeiro

Selected publications
  
 with Bernard Bonnard and Ludovic Faubourg:

References

External links
 homepage, Sorbonne Université
 
 
  (lecture in French, slides in English)

1974 births
Living people
21st-century French mathematicians
École Normale Supérieure alumni
University of Burgundy alumni
Academic staff of Pierre and Marie Curie University